Sixth Avenue is a major street in New York City.

Sixth Avenue may also refer to:

 Sixth Avenue (Tacoma), Washington

See also
 Sixth Avenue Line (Manhattan surface), a former public transit line in New York
 Sixth Avenue Bridge, also known as North Sixth Street Bridge, in northeastern New Jersey
 U.S. Route 6 in Colorado, part of which is known as the 6th Avenue freeway
 Sixth Avenue MRT station, an MRT station in Singapore
 Sixth Avenue Electronics, a Springfield, New Jersey-based retail chain
 6th Avenue Hotel-Windsor Hotel, a historic building in Phoenix, Arizona, US
 "6th Avenue Heartache", a 1996 song by The Wallflowers
 
 
 
 
 Sixth Avenue Line (disambiguation)
 6th Street (disambiguation)